The United States Open Tennis Championships is a hardcourt tennis tournament held annually at Flushing Meadows, starting on the last Monday in August and lasting for two weeks. The tournament consists of five main championship events: men's and women's singles, men's and women's doubles, and mixed doubles, with additional tournaments for seniors, juniors, and wheelchair players.

In 2009, the girls' singles event was won by Heather Watson of the United Kingdom who beat Yana Buchina of Russia, 6–4, 6–1 in the final.

Seeds

Draw

Finals

Top half

Section 1

Section 2

Bottom half

Section 3

Section 4

External links 
 Main Draw

Girls' Singles
US Open, 2009 Girls' Singles